Daniel Alton Moore Jr. (November 13, 1933 – about September 27, 2022) was a former justice of the Supreme Court of Alaska. He served from July 10, 1983 to December 31, 1995.

Born in Chicago, Illinois, after attending Cathedral High in Duluth, Minnesota, graduating from the University of Notre Dame in 1955, serving for two years in the U.S. Marine Corps, and graduating from the University of Denver Law School, Moore settled in Anchorage, Alaska, where he practiced law as a defense attorney for 20 years. His in-laws, the Crawford family, are an Anchorage business family spanning multiple generations.

After serving for two years as a Superior Court judge, in 1983 Moore was appointed to the Alaska Supreme Court by Governor Bill Sheffield. On September 3, 1992, Moore was elected by his fellow justices to serve as chief justice for a three-year term. Moore's term ended in September 1995; the justices then chose Allen T. Compton to succeed Moore as chief justice.

Moore died in September 2022, of COVID-19 complications, in Oregon, where he had moved in retirement.

References

|-

1933 births
Lawyers from Chicago
University of Notre Dame alumni
Lawyers from Anchorage, Alaska
Justices of the Alaska Supreme Court
Chief Justices of the Alaska Supreme Court